Galtara notabilis is a moth of the subfamily Arctiinae. It was described by Hervé de Toulgoët in 1980. It is found in the Democratic Republic of the Congo.

References

 

Nyctemerina
Moths described in 1980
Endemic fauna of the Democratic Republic of the Congo